McElhenney and McElhenny are both surnames. Notable people with the surname include:
Marcus McElhenney (born 1981), American rower
Hugh McElhenny (1928–2022), American football player
Rob McElhenney (born 1977), American actor

See also
Josiah McElheny (born 1966), American artist
Victor McElheny (born 1935), American science writer
Ausenbaugh–McElhenny House, historic building in Dayton, Ohio
McElhinney
McIlhenny

Anglicised Irish-language surnames